Vibeke Jensdatter (17 October 1638 – 17 October 1709) was a Danish merchant and land owner. She was one of the most successful business people of her country.

She was the daughter of city manager Jens Nielsen (died 1659) and Maren Jensdatter. She was married in 1656 to city manager and merchant Laurids Christensen Friis (1619–1659) of Ribe. She was widowed in 1659 and became one of four of her gender to have managed an export business from Ribe. She was the 4th biggest house owner in Ribe and retired in 1664 after having created a fortune. 

In 1678 she started business as a landowner. In 1686 she acquired the Vardho estate after having placed its former owner, Vibeke Pallesdatter Rosenkrantz (died in 1708) in prison because of debts. Vibeke Pallesdatter Rosenkrantz was the widow of nobleman Erik Krag (1620–1672) and the mother of Baron Frederik Krag (1655–1728).

References

1709 deaths
People from Ribe
1638 births
Danish merchants
18th-century Danish businesswomen
18th-century Danish businesspeople
17th-century Danish women landowners
17th-century Danish businesswomen
17th-century Danish businesspeople